Antipodogomphus proselythus is a species of dragonfly of the family Gomphidae, 
commonly known as the spinehead dragon. 
It is endemic to Queensland, Australia, where it inhabits streams, rivers and pools.

Gallery

See also
 List of Odonata species of Australia

References

Gomphidae
Odonata of Australia
Endemic fauna of Australia
Taxa named by René Martin
Insects described in 1901